The Cutch rat or Cutch rock-rat (Cremnomys cutchicus) is a species of rodent in the family Muridae.

It is found in India, where it is widely distributed in the states of Andhra Pradesh, Bihar, Gujarat, Jharkhand, Karnataka, and Rajasthan.

References

 Baillie, J. & CBSG CAMP India Workshop 2000.  Cremnomys cutchicus.   2006 IUCN Red List of Threatened Species.   Downloaded on 9 July 2007.

Cremnomys
Rodents of India
Rodents of Pakistan
Mammals described in 1912
Taxonomy articles created by Polbot